Bus is a surname. Notable people with the name include:

 Schelte J. Bus (born 1956), American astronomer
 Dave Bus (born 1978), Dutch professional footballer
 Dirk Bus (1907–1978), Dutch sculptor
 Nicole Bus, Dutch singer
 Balázs Bús, (born 1966), Hungarian social worker and politician

See also
 Buș, surname
 Buss, surname
 Busse, surname
 Bus (nickname)